Hadena perplexa, the tawny shears or pod lover, is a species of moth of the family Noctuidae. It is found in Morocco, Algeria, Tunisia, Europe, Turkey, Israel, Lebanon, Syria, Jordan, Iran, Iraq, northern Asia, Central Asia, northern India and western China.

Technical description and variation

The wingspan is 27–36 mm. Forewing olive grey brown or olive ochreous, clouded with darker; claviform stigma large, dark; orbicular and reniform with brown centres and white rings outlined with black; some black toothlike marks before submarginal line; hindwing dirty grey, darker towards termen; the veins dark. This darker form is the usual one throughout Europe; but is replaced in Britain by ochracea Haw. which is pale ochraceous with slightly darker markings; examples with an actually white ground colour are found on the chalk of the South of England, ab. pallida Tutt on the other hand, the darkest forms of ochracea Haw., with few markings but uniform in coloration, are known as brunnea Tutt.

Biology

Adults are on wing from February to May in one generation in Israel. In Europe flying from April to June, depending on the microclimate of the habitat locally bivoltine, flying from April to June and from August to September.

Larva pale putty colour, with the lines indistinct. The larvae feed on the flowers and seeds of Dianthus, Lychnis and Silene species. Other recorded food plants include Melandrium viscosum, Melandrium rubrum and Viscaria vulgaris.

Subspecies
Hadena perplexa perplexa
Hadena perplexa paghmana (Afghanistan)
Hadena perplexa plantei
Hadena perplexa capsophila

References

External links

Lepiforum
Funet Taxonomy
Fauna Europaea
Hadeninae of Israel
UKmoths

Hadena
Moths of Europe
Moths of Asia
Moths of Africa
Moths described in 1775